Squash competitions at the 1995 Pan American Games was held from March 11 to March 26 in Mar del Plata, Argentina. This marked the first squash competition at the Pan American Games.

Men's competition

Singles

Team

Women's competition

Singles

Team

Medal table

References

 Sports 123
 worldsquash
 squashflash

Events at the 1995 Pan American Games
P
1995